The Landlord and Tenant Act 1709 (8 Ann c 18) is an Act of the Parliament of Great Britain that regulates the relationship between tenants and their landlords.

This Act was partly in force in Great Britain at the end of 2010.

References

Great Britain Acts of Parliament 1709
Landlord–tenant law
Property law of the United Kingdom